List of Hungarian exonyms for places in Slovakia.  These names are used by the Hungarian ethnic minority in Slovakia, and they are also used in Hungary and other countries in the Central Europe, which are home of Hungarian minorities. In communities in Slovakia where the ethnic minority represents 20% or more of the population, it has certain cultural and linguistic rights.

See also
List of cities and towns in Slovakia

External links
 Former names of all Slovakia´s towns and villages prior IWW (prior 1918)

Cities and towns in Slovakia
Slovakia
Languages of Slovakia
Hungarian exonyms in Slovakia
Hungarian